Amerila bauri is a moth of the subfamily Arctiinae. It was described by Heinrich Benno Möschler in 1884. It is found in Mozambique, Namibia, South Africa and Zimbabwe.

The larvae feed on Eugenia species and Syzygium cordatum.

References

Möschler, H. B. 1884. Beiträge zur Schmetterlings-fauna des Kaffernlandes. - Verhandlungen der zoologisch-botanischen Gesellschaft Wien 33(1883):267–310, pl. 16

Moths described in 1884
Amerilini
Moths of Africa